The 1989 Anglian Windows British Open was a professional ranking snooker tournament, that was held from 1 February to 5 March 1989 with television coverage beginning on 25 February at the Assembly Rooms in Derby, England.

Tony Meo would win his only ranking event in snooker, defeating Dean Reynolds 13 frames to 6 in the Final.
 


Main draw

Final

References

British Open (snooker)
1989 in snooker
1989 in British sport